José Hugo Sousa dos Santos (born 17 October 1999), known as José Hugo, is a Brazilian footballer who plays as a forward for Azuriz.

Club career
José Hugo was born in João Pessoa, Paraíba, and made his senior debut with Farroupilha in 2018. He returned to his native state in 2019, playing for the under-20 side of Botafogo-PB, and represented São Gabriel for a short period in 2020 before becoming a free agent amidst the COVID-19 pandemic.

José Hugo played amateur football until an invitation from Nova Mutum arrived in 2021, and he was presented as a part of the squad in June of that year. A regular starter, he renewed his contract on 29 November, but was presented at Azuriz on 18 January 2022.

On 9 April 2022, José Hugo renewed his contract with Azuriz until December 2024. Four days later, he joined Série A side Coritiba on loan until the end of the year.

José Hugo made his debut in the top tier of Brazilian football on 15 May 2022, starting in a 1–0 home win over América Mineiro.

Career statistics

References

External links
Coritiba profile 

1999 births
Living people
People from João Pessoa, Paraíba
Brazilian footballers
Association football forwards
Campeonato Brasileiro Série A players
Campeonato Brasileiro Série D players
São Gabriel Futebol Clube players
Azuriz Futebol Clube players
Coritiba Foot Ball Club players